Praia is a concelho (municipality) of Cape Verde. It is situated in the southern part of the island of Santiago. Its seat is the city Praia, the capital of Cape Verde. The municipality consists of one freguesia (civil parish), Nossa Senhora da Graça. The city hall is located in the Platô part of the city.

History
Praia is one of the oldest municipalities in Cape Verde. It was created in the 18th century, when the then town of Praia de Santa Maria received town status and became the new capital of the Portuguese dominion of Cape Verde. Throughout history, its municipal territory has been successively reduced due to demographic increases.

By the end of the 19th century, the Municipality of Praia occupied the southern half of the island, while the northern half was the (larger than present) Municipality of Santa Catarina. In 1971, the two northernmost parishes of the Municipality were split off to become the Municipality of Santa Cruz, and the parish of São Salvador do Mundo became part of the municipality of Santa Catarina. In 1994, two more northern parishes of the Municipality were split off to become the Municipality of São Domingos. In 2005, two western parishes of the Municipality were split off to become the Municipality of Ribeira Grande de Santiago.

Subdivisions
The municipality is divided into the following localities for statistical reasons:

Achada Eugénio Lima
Achada Grande Frente
Achada Grande Tras
Achada Limpo
Achada Mato/Covão Mendes
Achada Palha de Se
Achada Santo António
Achada São Filipe
Achadinha
Achadinha Pires
Agostinho Alves
Água Funda
Bairro Craveiro Lopes
Bela Vista
Bom Coi Sul
Caiada
Calabaceira
Cambudjane
Chã de Areia
Cidadela Cova Minhoto
Coqueiro Castelão
Fazenda
Fig de Água
Gonçalo Afonso
João Bom
Lem Cachorro
Lem Dias
Lem Ferreira
Matão
Monte Gonçalo Afonso
Monte Ilhéu
Monte Pensamento
Monte Vaca
Monte Vermelho
Monteagarro
Paiol
Palmarejo
Palmarejo Grande
Palmarejo Santiago
Pedregal
Pensamento
Pizarra/Sarrado
Platô
Ponta de Água
Ponta do Sol
Portete de Cima
Praia Negra
Prainha
Quebra Canela
Ribeira São Filipe
Ribeirinha
Safende
São Francisco
São Francisco de Baixo
São Jorginho
São Martinho Pequeno
São Pedro Latada
São Tomé
Simão Ribeiro
Terra Branca
Tira Chapéu
Tira Chapéu Industrial
Trindade
Vale Palmarejo
Várzea
Veneza
Vera Cruz
Vila Nova
Zona do Aeroporto
Zona Enavi

Demography

Politics
At the federal level, Praia belongs to the constituency of Santiago South. Since 2008, the Movement for Democracy (MpD) is the ruling party of the municipality. The results of the latest elections, in 2016:

Presidents
José Ulisses Correia e Silva (MpD, 2006-2008 and 2013-2016)
Oscar Santos (MpD, since August 2016-2020)
Francisco Carvalho (PAICV, since April 2020)

References

External links
https://web.archive.org/web/20070928203332/http://www.cmpraia.cv/
ANMCV (Associação Nacional dos Municípios Cabo-Verdianos - National Association of the Capeverdean Municipalities)

Municipalities of Cape Verde